The Player's Handbook (spelled Players Handbook in first edition Advanced Dungeons & Dragons (AD&D)) is the name given to one of the core rulebooks in every edition of the fantasy role-playing game Dungeons & Dragons (D&D). It does not contain the complete set of rules for the game, and only includes rules for use by players of the game. Additional rules, for use by Dungeon Masters (DMs), who referee the game, can be found in the Dungeon Master's Guide. Many optional rules, such as those governing extremely high-level players, and some of the more obscure spells, are found in other sources.

Since the first edition, the Player's Handbook has contained tables and rules for creating characters, lists of the abilities of the different character classes, the properties and costs of equipment, descriptions of spells that magic-using character classes (such as wizards or clerics) can cast, and numerous other rules governing gameplay. Both the Dungeon Master's Guide and the Player's Handbook give advice, tips, and suggestions for various styles of play.  For most editions of D&D, The Player's Handbook, Dungeon Master's Guide, and Monster Manual make up the core rulebooks.

Advanced Dungeons & Dragons
The first Players Handbook was released in June 1978 as a 128-page hardcover. It was written by Gary Gygax and edited by Mike Carr, who also wrote the foreword. The original cover art was by D.A. Trampier, who also provided interior illustrations along with David C. Sutherland III. In this edition, the game rules were divided between the Players Handbook and the Dungeon Masters Guide, which was printed later. Later editions of the game moved the bulk of the game rules to the Player's Handbook, leaving information needed chiefly by the DM in the Dungeon Master's Guide. The new rules were so open-ended that game campaigns required a referee or Dungeon Master.

The Players Handbook contained the information needed to play the standard character classes: clerics (including druids), fighters (including rangers and paladins), magic-users (including illusionists), thieves (including assassins), and monks. The book also included information on non-human races, such as dwarves, elves, and halflings, character abilities, armor and weapons, spell descriptions, and optional rules for psionics.

The original Players Handbook was reviewed by Don Turnbull in issue No. 10 of White Dwarf, who gave the book a rating of 10 out of 10. Turnbull noted, "I don't think I have ever seen a product sell so quickly as did the Handbook when it first appeared on the Games Workshop stand at Dragonmeet", a British role-playing game convention; after the convention, he studied the book and concluded that "whereas the original rules are ambiguous and muddled, the Handbook is a detailed and coherent game-system, and very sophisticated." Turnbull felt a bit of apprehension at the amount of time it would require to digest all the new material, but concluded by saying "I said of the Monster Manual that it was TSR's most impressive publication to date; that is no longer true—this accolade must belong to the Handbook which is nothing short of a triumph."

In 1983, TSR changed the cover art of the Players Handbook, although the interior contents remained the same. This printing featured cover art by Jeff Easley. Printings with this cover also bear an orange spine that fits in with other Advanced Dungeons & Dragons books.

Numerous foreign editions of the Players Handbook were published, including versions for the United Kingdom, Australia, France, and Germany. Games Workshop (U.K.) published a softcover version also in 1978.

Dealers continued to place orders for the 1st edition Players Handbook even after 2nd edition was released, causing the final printing to be in July 1990, a year after the release of 2nd edition.

In 1999, a paperback reprint of the first edition was released.

In 2012, Wizards of the Coast released a new printing of the original book, billed as the "1st Edition Premium Player's Handbook", as part of a set of limited-edition reprints of the original 1st Edition core rulebooks: the Monster Manual, Player's Handbook, and Dungeon Master's Guide. These premium versions of the original AD&D rulebooks were reprinted with the original art and content, but feature a new cover design. Purchase of the reprinted Player's Handbook will help support the Gygax Memorial Fund—established to immortalize Gary Gygax with a memorial statue in Lake Geneva, Wisconsin.

Reviews
Casus Belli (Issue 5 - Sep 1981)
 Casus Belli #34 (Aug 1986)

Advanced Dungeons & Dragons 2nd edition

The Advanced Dungeons & Dragons 2nd edition Player's Handbook was a 256-page hardcover book written by David "Zeb" Cook and released in 1989. The original cover art is by Jeff Easley, and the book featured eight full-page color illustrations, as well as other interior illustrations by Douglas Chaffee, Larry Elmore, Craig Farley, John and Laura Lakey, Erik Olson, Jack Pennington, Jeff Butler, Jeff Easley, Jean E. Martin, and Dave Sutherland.

The Player's Handbook for 2nd edition was compatible with 1st edition rules, but was streamlined and clarified. The book included information on how to play the standard character classes: warriors (including fighters, paladins, and rangers), wizards (including mages and specialist wizards such as illusionists), priests (clerics and guidelines for variance by mythos, including the druid as an example), and rogues (including thieves and bards); while most character classes remained about the same as in the 1st edition rules, the bard was regularized, and the assassin and monk were dropped. TSR, Inc. also removed some races from the game, such as half-orcs, although some of these were added back into the game in supplements, such as The Complete Book of Humanoids. 

It was in the Player's Option - Spells & Magic book for the second edition that the artificier was first introduced, as a specialist choice for magic users specifically. Optional rules for skills, known as proficiencies, were added, and sections describing role-playing, combat, magic, time and movement, equipment, and spell descriptions were all expanded. The book included major changes regarding character classes, races, and magic, and incorporated many new rules that had been published in supplements such as Unearthed Arcana and Dragonlance Adventures.

The 2nd edition Player's Handbook was an Origins and Gamer's Choice award winner. Lawrence Schick, in his 1991 book Heroic Worlds, called the book "a vast improvement" over the 1st edition book; he noted that the monk character class had been "banished to Oriental Adventures where it belongs", but commented that the spell descriptions "have positively bloated to over 100 pages".

In 1995, a new version of the 2nd edition Player's Handbook was released as part of TSR's 25th anniversary. The book was revised, becoming sixty-four pages larger, mainly due to layout changes and new artwork. A new foreword in this edition specifically stated that the book was not Advanced Dungeons & Dragons 3rd edition.

The 2nd edition Player's Handbook was reproduced as a premium reprint on May 21, 2013.

Reception
In the May 1989 edition of Games International, James Wallis called the 2nd edition "an improvement over the original", but concluded that it was "a step forward for the game, but a very small step." Wallis felt that the many improvements called for by the "archaic mechanics" and "hugely overly-complex" rules had not been addressed, and that the game still provided "a terrible introduction to role-playing." He concluded that the designer "lacked the vision to see what could have been done with the material", and gave the book a below-average rating of 2 out of 5, saying, "AD&D may be the biggest selling rolegame of all time, but like the IBM PC, that doesn't mean that it isn't thoroughly obsolete and to be avoided."

Reviews
Magia i Miecz #22 (October 1995) (Polish)

Dungeons & Dragons 3rd edition

The third edition, published August 10, 2000, (with the Player's Handbook debuting at that year's Gen Con) represented a major overhaul of the game, including the adoption of the d20 system. The third edition also dropped the word Advanced from the title, as the publisher decided to publish only one version of the game instead of both basic and advanced versions.

Monte Cook, Jonathan Tweet, and Skip Williams all contributed to the 3rd edition Players Handbook, Dungeon Master's Guide, and Monster Manual, and then each designer wrote one of the books based on those contributions. Tweet is credited with the book's design.  Cover art is by Henry Higginbotham, with interior art by Lars Grant-West, Scott Fischer, John Foster, Todd Lockwood, David Martin, Arnie Swekel, and Sam Wood. The 3rd edition Player's Handbook also saw the return of half-orcs and monks to the core rules set, along with some all-new classes.

The reviewer from Pyramid commented on the release of third edition, stating: "There's a lot to like about Dungeons and Dragons 3rd Edition as seen in the Player's Handbook. The new artwork is gorgeous and evocative, and in the 286 pages of the main rulebook there's a lot of well-written and tightly packed rules." Another reviewer wrote a response to the first review. A third reviewer felt that the design team "smoothed out the rough edges from Advanced Dungeons & Dragon 2nd Edition and added tons of new goodies to make D&D 3rd Edition the best combat-oriented RPG you can buy".

In July 2003, the rules were revised again to version 3.5 based on two years of player feedback. Revisions to the Player's Handbook included the classes becoming more balanced against each other. When asked about the changes from the prior Player's Handbook release, Skip Williams said "I think they range from the almost invisible (unless it affects your character directly) to the pretty radical," while Andy Collins replied "Well, I don't think I'd call any of the changes "radical." Even though some characters will undergo some significant changes, the aim is for the character to still feel like the same character, only with more interesting and balanced options." Andy Collins is credited for the Player's Handbook 3.5 revision. Cover art is by Henry Higginbotham, with interior art by Lars Grant-West, Scott Fischer, John Foster, Jeremy Jarvis, Todd Lockwood, David Martin, Wayne Reynolds, Arnie Swekel, and Sam Wood.

May 2006 saw the release of the Player's Handbook II, designed to follow up the standard Player's Handbook. This book was designed by David Noonan. It contains four new classes, along with new spells, feats, and new role-playing options. Its cover pays homage to the 1st edition Player's Handbook.

The 3.5 edition Player's Handbook was reproduced as a premium reprint on September 18, 2012.

Reviews
SF Site

Dungeons & Dragons 4th edition

On June 6, 2008, the Fourth Edition Player's Handbook, subtitled Arcane, Divine and Martial Heroes, was released. It was originally announced that the 4th edition's three core rulebooks would be released over a three-month period, but the date changed after customer feedback revealed a majority preference among D&D customers to have all three core rulebooks released in the same month. The Fourth Edition Player's Handbook was designed by Rob Heinsoo, Andy Collins, and James Wyatt. The front cover illustration was by Wayne Reynolds and the back cover illustration was by Dan Scott, with interior illustrations by Zoltan Boros & Gabor Szikszai, Matt Cavotta, Eric Deschamps, Wayne England, David Griffith, Ralph Horsley, Howard Lyon, Raven Mimura, Lee Moyer, William O'Connor, Steve Prescott, Dan Scott, Anne Stokes, Franz Vohwinkel, and Eva Widermann.

The first Player's Handbook includes eight classes: cleric, fighter, paladin, ranger, rogue, warlock, warlord, and wizard, and eight races: dragonborn, dwarf, eladrin, elf, human, half-elf, halfling, and tiefling.  The warlock and warlord classes, and the dragonborn and tiefling races, represented new additions to the core rules, while the book left out previous core elements such as the monk and bard classes and the gnome and half-orc races.  Wizards of the Coast emphasized that those elements would be coming in subsequent Player's Handbooks and would be considered to be as central to the game as those in the first book.

The 4th edition Player's Handbook 2, subtitled Arcane, Divine and Primal Heroes, was released on March 17, 2009. The Player's Handbook 2 includes eight classes: the avenger, barbarian, bard, druid, invoker, shaman, sorcerer, and warden, and five races: the deva, gnome, goliath, half-orc, and shifter.  The book reached No. 28 on USA Todays bestseller list the week of March 26, 2009 and No. 14 on the Wall Street Journals non-fiction bestseller list a week later.

A third book in the series, Player's Handbook 3, subtitled Psionic, Divine and Primal Heroes, was released on March 16, 2010. Retrieved on 2011-02-20. The book was designed by Mike Mearls, Bruce R. Cordell, and Robert J. Schwalb, and featured cover art by Michael Komarck and interior art by Ralph Beisner, Eric Belisle, Kerem Beyit, Wayne England, Jason A. Engle, Carl Frank, Randy Gallegos, Adam Gillespie, Ralph Horsley, Roberto Marchesi, Jake Masbruch, Jim Nelson, William O'Connor, Hector Ortiz, Shane Nitzche, Wayne Reynolds, Chris Seaman, John Stanko, Matias Tapia, Beth Trott, Francis Tsai, Eva Widermann, Sam Wood, Ben Wootten, and Kieran Yanner. It includes six classes: ardent, battlemind, monk, psion, runepriest, and seeker, along with four races: wilden, the minotaur, githzerai, and shardminds. The PHB3 also includes new multi-classing rules for hybrid characters.

Reviews
Pyramid, Steve Jackson Games
Pyramid, Steve Jackson Games

Dungeons & Dragons 5th edition

The fifth edition Player's Handbook was released on August 19, 2014. The Player's Handbook contains the basic rules of the 5e system, the base classes and races, and character customization options.

Reception 
In Publishers Weekly's "Best-selling Books Week Ending September 1, 2014", Player's Handbook was #1 in "Hardcover Nonfiction" and sold 22,090 units. It remained in the top 25 for four weeks. 

The 5th edition Player's Handbook won the 2015 Origins Award for Best Role Playing Game and Fan Favorite Role Playing Game. The book won three 2015 gold ENnie Awards, "Best Game", "Best Rules", "Product of the Year", and one silver award for "Best Writing" by Jeremy Crawford, James Wyatt, Robert J. Schwalb, and Bruce R. Cordell.

Chuck Francisco of mania.com commented: "While it was an easily accessible system, 4e left a lukewarm feeling with my gaming group. There was something too generic and uninteresting about player characters which pervaded the system, especially in the wake of 3.5e (which some felt provided too many options so as to be confusing). In the process, 4e characters lost an indescribable crunchy feeling, but I'm pleased to say that it's been brought back for the newest installment of this venerated table top series."

Andrew Zimmerman Jones of Black Gate comments on the 5th edition Player's Handbook: "Their rules light approach make it a natural system for old fans to bring new players into the hobby, but even with this initial offering there are enough customization options to keep old school gamers happy playing with it."

See also

Editions of Dungeons & Dragons
List of alternate Dungeons & Dragons classes

References

Further reading
Review: AD&D Second Edition Player's Handbook, White Wolf #17 (1989)
"Sage Advice", Dragon #148.
"Sage Advice", Dragon #149.
"Sage Advice", Dragon #157.
 Casus Belli #34 (Aug 1986)

1978 books
1989 books
2000 books
2003 books
2008 books
2014 books
Books by Gary Gygax
Dungeons & Dragons sourcebooks
ENnies winners
Handbooks and manuals
Origins Award winners
Role-playing game supplements introduced in 1978

sv:Player's Handbook